Gowd-e Gerd (also known as Gowd-e Gerdū’īyeh) is a village in Hanza Rural District, Hanza District, Rabor County, Kerman Province, Iran. At the 2006 census, its population was 33, in 9 families.

References 

Populated places in Rabor County